Rafael Hechevarría (1908 – death date unknown) was a Cuban first baseman in the Negro leagues in the 1930s.

A native of Guanabacoa, Cuba, Hechevarría played for the Cuban Stars (East) in 1937. In five recorded games, he posted eight hits in 25 plate appearances.

References

External links
Baseball statistics and player information from Baseball-Reference Black Baseball Stats and Seamheads

1908 births
Date of birth missing
Year of death missing
Place of death missing
Cuban Stars (East) players
Baseball first basemen
Baseball players from Havana